Kudrovo is a town in Vsevolozhsky District of Leningrad Oblast, Russia, located east of and immediately adjacent to the city of St. Petersburg. Formerly a village, it was granted town status on 29 June 2018. As of the 2021 census, Kudrovo was home to 60 791 inhabitants.

History
In 2010, the population of the village was just over 100. Subsequently, intensive high-rise residential construction started, and apartments were sold to individuals who had jobs in nearby Saint Petersburg. The infrastructure lagged considerably behind this development. There is no industry or large-scale infrastructure in Kudrovo.

Administrative and municipal status
Within the framework of administrative divisions, it is incorporated, together with the urban-type settlement of Yanino-1 and a number of rural localities, within Vsevolozhsky District as Zanevskoye Settlement Municipal Formation. As a municipal division, Zanevskoye Settlement Municipal Formation is incorporated within Vsevolozhsky Municipal District as Zanevskoye Urban Settlement.

Economy

Transportation
Ulitsa Dybenko station, a metro station of the Saint Petersburg Metro, is located less than a kilometer from the western boundary of Kudrovo. Buses connect Kudrovo with this station. Kudrovo is separated from Saint Petersburg by a railway line, which does not have passenger traffic.

References

Notes

Sources

Cities and towns in Leningrad Oblast
Vsevolozhsky District
Sankt-Peterburgsky Uyezd